Richland City is a town in Luce Township, Spencer County, in the U.S. state of Indiana.  Until 2008, it was an unincorporated community; the town's residents voted to incorporate in the November 2008 general election. The population was 425 at the 2010 census.

The town is developing plans to offer certain services to its residents.  Police protection will not be provided by the town, but through an arrangement with the Spencer County Sheriff's Department.

History
Richland City was laid out in 1861. The town was so named on account of their fertile soil.

The first post office was established in 1862, under the name Lake. It was renamed Richland in 1921, and has still been operating since.

Geography

Demographics

2010 census
As of the census of 2010, there were 425 people, 170 households, and 121 families residing in the town. The racial makeup of the town was 98.6% White, 0.2% African American, 0.5% Native American, and 0.7% from two or more races. Hispanic or Latino of any race were 1.2% of the population.

There were 170 households, of which 41.2% had children under the age of 18 living with them, 56.5% were married couples living together, 9.4% had a female householder with no husband present, 5.3% had a male householder with no wife present, and 28.8% were non-families. 23.5% of all households were made up of individuals, and 11.1% had someone living alone who was 65 years of age or older. The average household size was 2.50 and the average family size was 2.99.

The median age in the town was 35.2 years. 28% of residents were under the age of 18; 5.7% were between the ages of 18 and 24; 25.8% were from 25 to 44; 28.5% were from 45 to 64; and 12% were 65 years of age or older. The gender makeup of the town was 50.1% male and 49.9% female.

Education
Richland City has a public library, a branch of Spencer County Public Library.

References

External links
 Access Spencer County – Richland

 
Towns in Spencer County, Indiana